The following highways are numbered 192:

Japan
 Japan National Route 192

United States
 U.S. Route 192
 Alabama State Route 192
 California State Route 192
 Connecticut Route 192
 Georgia State Route 192
 Illinois Route 192
 Iowa Highway 192
 K-192 (Kansas highway)
 Kentucky Route 192
 Maine State Route 192
 Maryland Route 192
 Massachusetts Route 192
 New Mexico State Road 192
 New York State Route 192 (former)
 North Carolina Highway 192 (former)
 Ohio State Route 192 (former)
 Pennsylvania Route 192
 Tennessee State Route 192
 Texas State Highway 192 (former)
 Texas State Highway Spur 192
 Farm to Market Road 192 (Texas)
 Utah State Route 192 (former)
 Virginia State Route 192
 Wisconsin Highway 192 (former)
 Wyoming Highway 192
Territories
 Puerto Rico Highway 192